Rodrigo Augusto Sartori Costa (born 11 January 1983), better known as Villa, is a Brazilian footballer .

Football career
Surnamed Sartori-Costa, he holds an Italian nationality by descent.

He started his career at Corinthians Paulista. In 2004, he left for Serra Negra. On 2 July 2004, he left Brazil for Pasto of Colombia. He then played for Guaraní Antonio Franco and C.D. Santa Rita of Ecuador  until 29 July 2005, back to Brazil for Portuguesa (SP).

On 8 February 2006, Villa left Brazil again, this time to C.A. Rentistas, and on 31 August 2007 arrived in Europe to play for Chiasso.

External links
 Brazilian FA Database
 Profile at footballbrazil.net

1983 births
Living people
Brazilian footballers
Brazilian expatriate footballers
Expatriate footballers in Bulgaria
Associação Atlética Portuguesa (Santos) players
FC Chiasso players
Brazilian people of Italian descent
Association football midfielders
Expatriate footballers in Switzerland
First Professional Football League (Bulgaria) players
PFC Belasitsa Petrich players
Brazilian expatriate sportspeople in Bulgaria
Footballers from São Paulo